Ford Belmont Spinks, Sr. (April 5, 1927 – July 27, 2016) was an American politician who was a Democratic member of the Georgia State Senate from 1962 to 1971. After his senate term, he was the public services commissioner of Georgia from 1971 to 1989. He was a farm equipment dealer.

Spinks died on July 27, 2016.

References

1927 births
2016 deaths
People from Tifton, Georgia
Businesspeople from Georgia (U.S. state)
Republican Party Georgia (U.S. state) state senators
20th-century American businesspeople